Qada may refer to:
Qadan culture of Northeastern Africa (15,000 BCE to 11,000 BCE)
Qada (Islamic term), judgement or fulfillment of neglected duties
The Arabic form of the Turkish administrative division Kaza